Music for Flute & Double-Bass is an album by flautist Jeremy Steig and bassist Eddie Gómez recorded in New York in 1978 and released on the German CMP label.

Track listing
All compositions by Jeremy Steig and Eddie Gomez except where noted 
 "Aracelis" (Eddie Gomez) – 7:59
 "Nein-Four" – 2:57
 "Steigmatism" (Jeremy Steig) – 3:08
 "7:11" (Steig) – 5:07
 "Voyage of the Elves" – 10:07
 "Space Shuttle" – 2:00
 "Mezmerized" (Gomez) – 3:10
 "Vamp's Bite" (Gomez) – 3:11

Personnel
Jeremy Steig – alto flute, bass flute, Mu-Tron III Mu-Tron biphase, Mu-Tron octave divider, echoplex, ring modulator
Eddie Gómez − bass

References

Jeremy Steig albums
Eddie Gómez albums
1979 albums
Albums recorded at Electric Lady Studios